BCIE may refer to:
Banco Centroamericano de Integración Economica, a Central American banking establishment
Bullous congenital ichthyosiform erythroderma, a rare genetic disorder of the skin
The Bell Centre for Information Engineering, a research group at the University of Western Ontario in the area of wireless communications and networking